Padanthalumoodu is located in Kanyakumari District of Tamil Nadu.  The area of Padanthalumoodu lies in the taluk of Vilavancode and has a Sub Post Office. Padanthalumoodu officially lies in the postal division of Kanniyakumari, postal region of Madurai and postal circle of Tamil Nadu.  It is located at 5.5 km from Marthandam and about 750 km south-southwest of capital city Chennai.

History
Originally the name was Padantha-alumoodu (படந்த ஆலுமூடு) because there were once a huge Banyan tree, circled outskirts of the village and people believed to guard it and latter when NH47 road was laid between Nagercoil and Trivandrum and by climate changes the Banyan was lost. People used this Banyan tree for Trade and Learning. Due to time the original name joined together from Padantha-alumoodu (Village of huge Banyan) to Padanthalumoodu (படந்தாலுமூடு). Presently one Banyan Tree stands at the Junction known as Aalumoodu (ஆலுமூடு) also called as Karuppattiyalumoodu.

Culture
People of this town generally know both Tamil and Malayalam languages, because of its proximity to the border state of Kerala. Tamil and Malayalam are widely spoken by the people. The culture is a mixture of Tamil and Malayalam culture and traditions. Hinduism and Christianity are the major religions in the town.

Youth wing 
 Nethaji Thentral Youth Wing (நேதாஜி தென்றல் இளைஞர் இயக்கம்) is the active youth wing in CHANTHAVILAI (Padanthalumoodu). They help poor people and encourage the youngsters to achieve something in life. There will be yearly celebrations conducted on August 15th (Independence Day) by the youngsters.

Major festivals
Onam, Deepavali, Christmas, Ramzan, Newyear, Easter, Independence day and all the respective religious festivals.

Sports
Cricket  & Kabaddi is the major games played around Padanthalumoodu.

IT Companies
Dunlark Technologies Private Limited is a Leading IT Company Located in Padanthalumoodu since 2013

Schools
TCK Higher Secondary School, Padanthalumoodu
Sacred Heart Primary School, Kamaraj Nager, Padanthalumoodu
Sacred Heart Matriculation Higher Secondary School, Padanthalumoodu

College
Grace College Of Nursing, Padanthalumoodu
Grace College of Education, Padanthalumoodu
Villages in Kanyakumari district

Other Major Companies 
 St. Antony's Auto Engineering Works located in Padanthalumoodu is a major company, making Truss Roofings and Stainless Steel works, active since 1978.
 Raj Insulations and Training Center is a popular manpower consultancy, offers training on the trades, Sheet Metal Fitter, Sheet Metal Fabricator and Insulator and hiring people for various foreign companies.
Rich India Steels, the whole sale and retail supplier of Stainless Steel Pipes, Stainless Steel Furniture & Fittings, Pipe Bending, Since 2019.